Nader Shariatmadari (1960 – 3 August 2021) was an Iranian geotechnical and geoenvironmental engineer and conservative politician.

Biography
He was a Tehran councillor from 2003 to 2007 and was a professor at Iran University of Science and Technology. He did not seek reelection to the office.

Shariatmadari died from COVID-19 at age 61.

References
Notes

Sources
 Councillor profile
 

1960 births
2021 deaths
People from Tehran
Tehran Councillors 2003–2007
Alliance of Builders of Islamic Iran politicians
Iran University of Science and Technology alumni
Academic staff of Iran University of Science and Technology
University of Ottawa alumni
Geotechnical engineers
Deaths from the COVID-19 pandemic in Iran